Graph algebra is systems-centric modeling tool for the social sciences.  It was first developed by Sprague, Pzeworski, and Cortes as a hybridized version of engineering plots to describe social phenomena.

Notes and references 

Algebra
Social science methodology